Piano Day is held on the 88th day of the year (March 29th in normal years and March 28th in leap years) in celebration of and reference to the 88 keys on a standard piano. From an idea by the German pianist and composer Nils Frahm in 2015 "because it doesn’t hurt to celebrate the piano and everything around it: performers, composers, piano builders, tuners, movers and most important, the listener", the event has grown in subsequent years with amateur and commercial success.

Each year live concerts and online events have been held, recent locations including Moscow, Alicante, Helsinki, Rennes, Leeds, Melbourne, Sacramento, Copenhagen and many others, listed annually on the event's website. There are also SoundCloud and Spotify playlists available from each year.

In 2015 the Piano Day team announced the construction of a vertical concert grand piano, the Klavins M450.

On Piano Day 2018 Christian Henson of Spitfire Audio launched a website and YouTube channel called Pianobook dedicated to creating and sharing sampled instruments for free.

References

External links
 
 Official event Facebook page
 2022 Soundcloud playlist
 2021 Soundcloud playlist
 2020 Soundcloud playlist
 2019 Soundcloud playlist
 2018 Soundcloud playlist
 2017 Soundcloud playlist
 2016 Soundcloud playlist

Music events
Piano
March observances